The 2000 European Curling Championships were held in Oberstdorf, Germany from December 9 to 16.

Men's

A tournament

Final round-robin standings

Playoffs

Medals

Women's

A tournament

Final round-robin standings

Playoffs

Medals

References
Men: 
Women: 

Curling Championships
European Curling Championships
International curling competitions hosted by Germany
2000 in European sport
2000 in German sport
December 2000 sports events in Europe
Sports competitions in Oberstdorf